Ralph Palmer (11 April 1783 - 25 January 1838) was a British judge who served as the 4th Chief Justice of Madras from 1825 to 1835.

Personal life 
His parents were William Palmer and Mary Horsley. He married Margaret Eliza Fearon in 1829.

References 

British India judges
1783 births
1838 deaths
British people in colonial India